Criquetot-l'Esneval is a commune in the Seine-Maritime department in the Normandy region in northern France. The physician and erudite Louis-Henri Baratte was born in Criquetot-l'Esneval in 1803.

Geography

Population

Places of interest
 The two 16th century manorhouses.
 The church of Notre-Dame, dating from the eleventh century.

See also
Communes of the Seine-Maritime department

References

External links

 Criquetot-l'Esneval official website

Communes of Seine-Maritime